Morathennage Douglas Ranasinghe (born May 27, 1945), is an actor in Sri Lankan cinema, theater, and television. He acted in many supportive roles in movies including Akkara Paha, Yuganthaya, Viragaya, Sri Siddhartha Gautama and Dharmayuddhaya.

Personal life
Douglas Ranasinghe was born on 27 May 1945 in Thorawathura village, Kurunegala as the fourth child of the family. His father, James Ranasinghe, was a landowner and planter where he also served as a Village Head and Village Administration Secretary as well. His mother Seelawathi Valimuni was a teacher. Douglas was educated at St. Anne's College, Kurunegala. He is a fluent speaker of the College Sinhala and English Debating Team, a boxer, a member of the Cadet Corps and an athlete. He topped the 200 meters as a long distance runner and was also a short story writer. 

The Ranasinghe couple had seven children. The eldest in the family, Malkanthi Gunaratne was also a writer and married to the owner of Maradana Ratna Book Publishing Company, L. A. Gunaratne. The second is Rupa Khemaratne, an English teacher. The third was Prema Srimathi worked as a Teacher Training Housing Superintendent in Ihalagama. The fifth is Lionel, a planter. Chandrara Siriwardena is the sixth child who served in the Ports Authority. Youngest one is Tilaka Ranasinghe, an actress and broadcaster. Tilaka Ranasinghe worked at Sri Lanka Broadcasting Corporation. Thilaka was married to singer Narada Disasekara. The couple has one son Saranga Disasekara, an actor in Sinhala cinema and television. Saranga was married to popular actress Dinakshie Priyasad.

He studied at St. Anne's College, Kurunegala and excellent in sports. After the school, he was interested to become a lawyer and applied for Law College. However, then he applied for the post of Sub Inspector. He failed twice, but succeeded in third attempt. He was then transferred to a training course at Kalutara.

Ranasinghe is married to Sandya Kumari, and the couple has one son, Shribodhi Indrakeela.

Career
Douglas came to Colombo from Kurunegala in 1966 to meet playwright Sathischandra Edirisinghe with his close relative Peter Amarasinghe. Then he got a character certificate from Edirisinghe for a police service interview. However, Edirisinghe brought Douglas to Henry Jayasena for his play. He was chosen to play the role in stage drama Hunuwataye Kathawa by Henry Jayasena. This turned him towards the drama career. He acted in many critically acclaimed stage plays including Henry Jayasena's Apata Puthe Magak Nathe and Ediriweera Sarachchandra's Hotabari Yuddhe. He also appeared in the plays: Dunḍu Berē, Janēlaya, Kuvēṇi, The wedding, Taming of the Sorrow and Ahas Māḷigā. His last stage drama acting was Kusa Pabawathi.

His maiden cinema acting came through 1970 film Akakra Paha, however his second film Romeo Juliet Kathawak directed by G. D. L. Perera released before Akkara Paha. He acted in the short film Bhavana, directed by the Paul Zils. With that film, he was able to entered into the Berlin Film Festival of 1970/1971. Then he completed a three-year course at the London School of Filmmaking. After the course, he was asked to stay back and take part in Shakespearean productions. However, he refused the offer and landed to Sri Lanka. 

In 1980s, he was the voice actor in the programs Guwan Viduli Ranga Madala and Keti Katha produced by Sugathapala de Silva. As a radio sound administrator, he recorded high drama, feature and music programs. He has directed few stage plays and television serials including Ranmasu Uayana and Sasara Chakra respectively. As a television actor, he made notable roles in the serials: Avasanda, Maṭa Mahalu Vayasē, Ranmasu Uyana and Kaḷu Hansayō. He attended a three-year course at the International Film School in London, where he wrote the screenplay for the film Dancing Devils.

Selected television serials

 Akuru Maki Na
 Dedunu Sihina 
 Ganga Addara 
 Indrakeelaya
 Ithin Eelangataසංගීතේ'
 Punaragamanaya 
 Ranga Soba 
 Ran Poruwa 
 Ridee Tharaka
 Samanala Sihinaya 
 Samanala Wasanthaya 
 Sanda Siththam
 Sandali Saha Radika 
 Sandawathaka Waruna 
 Sangeethe
 Sapiriwara 
 Sewwandi
 Suwanda Hamana Manamali
 Thodu

Filmography

References

External links
 සංගීතේ හින්දා මම හරි ජනප‍්‍රියයි - ඩග්ලස් රණසිංහ
 Douglas Ranasinghe was my best friend at the time

Sri Lankan male film actors
Sri Lankan male television actors
Sinhalese male actors
1942 births
Living people